The 2020 Fordham Rams baseball team will represent Fordham University during the 2020 NCAA Division I baseball season. It is the program's 161st season of existence, and their 26th season playing in the Atlantic 10 Conference. General manager, Kevin Leighton will be assuming managerial duties for the 10th season.

Fordham enters 2020 as the defending Atlantic 10 Tournament champions.

Schedule

! style="background:#700429;color:white;"| Regular Season
|- valign="top" 

|- align=center  bgcolor=ffdddd
| February 14 || || at FIU* || Infinity Insurance Park • Miami, FL || L 7–20 || 0–1 || — 
|- align=center  bgcolor=ffdddd
| February 15 || || at FIU* || Infinity Insurance Park • Miami, FL || L 0–8  || 0–2 || — 
|- align=center  bgcolor=ffdddd
| February 16 || || at FIU* || Infinity Insurance Park • Miami, FL || L 2–18 || 0–3 || — 
|- align=center  bgcolor="#ddffdd"
| February 19 || || LIU* || Houlihan Park • The Bronx, NY || W 3–0 || 1–3 || — 
|- align=center  bgcolor=ffdddd 
| February 21 || || vs. Cal State Northridge* || Brazell Field • Phoenix, AZ || L 5–12 || 1–4 || — 
|- align=center bgcolor=ffdddd 
| February 22 || || at Grand Canyon* || Brazell Field • Phoenix, AZ || L 3–6 || 1–5 || — 
|- align=center bgcolor=ffdddd 
| February 23 || || at Grand Canyon* || Brazell Field • Phoenix, AZ || L 3–4 || 1–6 || — 
|- align=center bgcolor="#ddffdd"
| February 25 || || Sacred Heart* || Houlihan Park • The Bronx, NY || W 5–4  || 2–6 || — 
|- align=center bgcolor="#ddffdd"
| February 28 || || at Furman* || Latham Stadium • Greenville, SC || W 5–1 || 3–6  || — 
|- align=center bgcolor="#ddffdd"
| February 29 || || at Furman* || Latham Stadium • Greenville, SC || W 8–3 || 4–6 || — 
|-

|- align=center bgcolor="#ddffdd" 
| March 1 || || at Furman* || Latham Stadium • Greenville, SC || W 11–3 || 5–6 || — 
|- align=center bgcolor="#ddffdd" 
| March 4 || || NJIT* || Houlihan Park • The Bronx, NY || W 3–1 || 6–6 || — 
|- align=center bgcolor="#ddffdd" 
| March 6 || || Iona* || Houlihan Park • The Bronx, NY || W 5–1 || 7–6 || — 
|- align=center bgcolor="#ddffdd" 
| March 7 || || Iona* || Houlihan Park • The Bronx, NY || W 16–2 || 8–6 || — 
|- align=center bgcolor="#ddffdd" 
| March 8 || || Iona* || Houlihan Park • The Bronx, NY || W 11–0 || 9–6 || — 
|- align=center bgcolor="#ddffdd" 
| March 11 || || Wagner* || Houlihan Park • The Bronx, NY || W 11–5 || 10–6 || — 
|- align=center bgcolor="#bbbbbb" 
| March 13 || || St. John's* || Houlihan Park • The Bronx, NY ||colspan="3" rowspan="13"| Cancelled due to the COVID-19 pandemic
|- align=center bgcolor="#bbbbbb" 
| March 14 || || at St. John's* || Jack Kaiser Stadium • Queens, NY 
|- align=center bgcolor="#bbbbbb" 
| March 15 || || at St. John's* || Jack Kaiser Stadium • Queens, NY 
|- align=center bgcolor="#bbbbbb" 
| March 18 || || at Cal Baptist* || James W. Totman Stadium • Riverside, CA 
|- align=center bgcolor="#bbbbbb" 
| March 20 || || at UC Santa Barbara* || Caesar Uyesaka Stadium • Santa Barbara, CA 
|- align=center bgcolor="#bbbbbb" 
| March 21 || || at UC Santa Barbara* || Caesar Uyesaka Stadium • Santa Barbara, CA 
|- align=center bgcolor="#bbbbbb" 
| March 22 || || at UC Santa Barbara* || Caesar Uyesaka Stadium • Santa Barbara, CA 
|- align=center bgcolor="#bbbbbb" 
| March 24 || || at Sacred Heart* || Veterans Memorial Park • Bridgeport, CT 
|- align=center bgcolor="#bbbbbb" 
| March 25 || || Manhattan* || Houlihan Park • The Bronx, NY 
|- align=center bgcolor="#bbbbbb" 
| March 27 || || Rhode Island || Houlihan Park • The Bronx, NY 
|- align=center bgcolor="#bbbbbb" 
| March 28 || || Rhode Island || Houlihan Park • The Bronx, NY 
|- align=center bgcolor="#bbbbbb" 
| March 29 || || Rhode Island || Houlihan Park • The Bronx, NY 
|- align=center bgcolor="#bbbbbb"  
| March 31 || || Siena* || Houlihan Park • The Bronx, NY 
|-

|- align=center bgcolor="#bbbbbb" 
| April 3 || || at Saint Louis || Billiken Sports Center • St. Louis, MO ||colspan="3" rowspan="16"| Cancelled due to the COVID-19 pandemic
|- align=center bgcolor="#bbbbbb" 
| April 4 || || at Saint Louis || Billiken Sports Center • St. Louis, MO 
|- align=center bgcolor="#bbbbbb" 
| April 5 || || at Saint Louis || Billiken Sports Center • St. Louis, MO 
|- align=center bgcolor="#bbbbbb" 
| April 7 || || at Siena* || Siena Baseball Field • Loudonville, NY 
|- align=center bgcolor="#bbbbbb" 
| April 9 || || at Saint Joseph's || Smithson Field • Merion Station, PA 
|- align=center bgcolor="#bbbbbb" 
| April 10 || || at Saint Joseph's || Smithson Field • Merion Station, PA 
|- align=center bgcolor="#bbbbbb" 
| April 11 || || at Saint Joseph's || Smithson Field • Merion Station, PA 
|- align=center bgcolor="#bbbbbb" 
| April 14 || || Fairfield* || Houlihan Park • The Bronx, NY 
|- align=center bgcolor="#bbbbbb" 
| April 17 || || George Washington || Houlihan Park • The Bronx, NY
|- align=center bgcolor="#bbbbbb" 
| April 18 || || George Washington || Houlihan Park • The Bronx, NY
|- align=center bgcolor="#bbbbbb" 
| April 19 || ||George Washington || Houlihan Park • The Bronx, NY
|- align=center bgcolor="#bbbbbb" 
| April 22 || || at Columbia* || Satow Stadium • Manhattan, NY 
|- align=center bgcolor="#bbbbbb" 
| April 24 || || at La Salle || Hank DeVincent Field • Philadelphia, PA 
|- align=center bgcolor="#bbbbbb" 
| April 25 || || at La Salle || Hank DeVincent Field • Philadelphia, PA 
|- align=center bgcolor="#bbbbbb" 
| April 26 || || at La Salle || Hank DeVincent Field • Philadelphia, PA 
|- align=center bgcolor="#bbbbbb" 
| April 28 || || Albany* || Houlihan Park • The Bronx, NY
|-

|- align=center bgcolor="#bbbbbb" 
| May 1 || || Davidson || Houlihan Park • The Bronx, NY ||colspan="3" rowspan="9"| Cancelled due to the COVID-19 pandemic
|- align=center bgcolor="#bbbbbb" 
| May 2 || || Davidson || Houlihan Park • The Bronx, NY 
|- align=center bgcolor="#bbbbbb" 
| May 3 || || Davidson || Houlihan Park • The Bronx, NY 
|- align=center bgcolor="#bbbbbb" 
| May 8 || || at Richmond || Malcolm U. Pitt Field • Richmond, VA 
|- align=center bgcolor="#bbbbbb" 
| May 9 || || at Richmond || Malcolm U. Pitt Field • Richmond, VA 
|- align=center bgcolor="#bbbbbb" 
| May 10 || || at Richmond || Malcolm U. Pitt Field • Richmond, VA 
|- align=center bgcolor="#bbbbbb" 
| May 14 || || UMass || Houlihan Park • The Bronx, NY 
|- align=center bgcolor="#bbbbbb"  
| May 15 || || UMass || Houlihan Park • The Bronx, NY 
|- align=center bgcolor="#bbbbbb" 
| May 16 || || UMass || Houlihan Park • The Bronx, NY 
|-

|-
! style="background:#700429;color:white;"| Postseason
|- valign="top" 

|- align=center bgcolor="#bbbbbb" 
| May 20 || || vs. TBD || The Diamond • Richmond, VA ||colspan="3"| Cancelled due to the COVID-19 pandemic
|-

Rankings

References 

Fordham
Fordham Rams baseball seasons
Fordham Rams baseball